Nigel Stanford (full name: Nigel John Stanford) is a New Zealand composer, best known for his soundtrack for the movie TimeScapes directed by Tom Lowe, as well as his music videos Cymatics and Automatica.

In January 2019, a Huawei commercial was accused to be plagiarizing Stanford's Cymatics video; Huawei eventually removed the video.

Discography

Albums
 Deep Space (1999) (as John Stanford)
 Timescapes (2012)
 Solar Echoes (2014)
 Automatica (2017)

Singles
 "Cymatics" (2014)
 "Automatica" (2017)
 "One Hundred Hunters" (2018)
 "Forever" (2018)

Remixes
 Last Night on Earth (Celldweller) (Nigel Stanford Remix) (2018)

Filmography
Nigel contributed in the film TimeScapes directed by Tom Lowe. This is an English language documentary about arts, nature with no narration published in 2012 .

References

External links
 

Living people
Musicians from Wellington
New Zealand songwriters
Male songwriters
Year of birth missing (living people)